Robin Beauclerk Smith (February 28, 1955) is a South African actor whose professional career began in theater whilst still in high school in 1970. He attended the University of Cape Town Drama School after school and worked at The Space Theater in Cape Town doing Socio Political shows during apartheid. He moved to Johannesburg in 1979 to continue his career in theater, and to get into television, which was based there. He broke into movies during the heyday of the B grade action movies in the 1980s, and was for a short time in 1997, a wrestling manager for the then WWF now WWE. He was known in the World Wrestling Federation as The Commandant, who managed the South African Truth Commission for 9 months in 1997.

Born in South Africa, he is a film and stage actor, as well as a voice artist. He appeared in many South African and international movies throughout the 1980s and 1990s and is still working as an actor, voice artist and director, based in Cape Town South Africa.

Career

Professional wrestling
Smith became a professional wrestling manager in early 1997. Bret Hart visited South Africa and met Smith. Hart recommended him for a role as a manager in the World Wrestling Federation (WWF), however he never fought as a wrestler. Smith made his wrestling debut in Tennessee in the United States Wrestling Association (USWA). He managed under the name Commandant, and managed a stable of paramilitary wrestlers including "Interrogator", "Tank" and "Recon" as the "Truth Commission"; a take on the similarly named Truth and Reconciliation Commission in South Africa.

This team won the USWA Tag Team Championship three times. In June 1997, the Truth Commission made their WWF debut. Smith made promos on WWF about the Truth Commission and attacking the United States for not having discipline. He was hated by the fans. "Sniper" replaced "Tank" on the commission. He was interviewed by Sunny, but scared her by yelling at her. During the summer of 1997 the group lost only to The Legion of Doom. In September, Smith was replaced by The Jackyl; the reason for Smith's departure was because Smith wasn't trained to wrestle and the WWF needed a manager who could take bumps and take part in the matches. Smith returned to South Africa, ending his wrestling career.

Acting 
Robin Smith first appeared professionally in 1970 in the theater production "Hadrian V11" whilst still at high school in Cape Town South Africa. 
Two more professional appearances onstage before leaving school led to him attending the University of Cape Town Drama school after completing his schooling at St. Georges Grammar School. 
Two and a half years into the 3-year course, he left Drama School to work at the Space Theater in Cape Town, founded by the author Athol Fugard, actress Yvonne Bryceland, and her photographer husband Brian Asbury to raise public awareness during the dark years of Apartheid. 
He moved to Johannesburg in 1979 to continue his career in the theater and to try to break into TV, which only first came to South Africa in 1976.
He has appeared in more than 100 feature films and TV shows to date, is an accomplished stage performer and a prolific voice artist. 
He returned to Cape Town, his home town, in 2006, and continues to work in film, TV and theater.

Selected filmography 

 Die Troudag van Tant Ralie (1975) - Darts player (uncredited)
 My Country My Hat (1983) - Policeman
 Torn Allegiance (1984) - Willits
 Deadly Passion (1985) - Hank the Bouncer
 The Hidden Farms (1985, Short) - Koos de Wet
 Vyfster: Die Slot (1986) - Gabba
 n Wêreld Sonder Grense (1987) - Phil
 Scavengers (1987) - Patrick
 Red Scorpion (1987) - Russian Officer
 Blind Justice (1988) - Max
 Paradise Road (1988) - Langert
 Diamond in the Rough (1988) - Connors' Superior
 The Schoolmaster (1988)
 Merchants of War (1989) - Harry Gere
 Brutal Glory (1989) - Bus Driver
 Jobman (1989) - Cop #2
 Screen Two (1989, TV Series) - Charlie Clarke
 Accidents (1989) - Raymond Oscar
 Death Force (1989) - Robert McCullam - Private Investigator
 Reason to Die (1990) - Otto
 Any Man's Death (1990) - Ulrich
 Return to Justice (1990) - Cheever
 The Revenger (1990) - Chuck
 The Schoolmaster (1990) - van Wyk
 The Fourth Reich (1990) - Sgt Meintjes
 American Ninja 4: The Annihilation (1990) - Schultz
 Deadly Hunter (aka: Pursuit) (1991) - Crazy Ezra
 Die Prince van Pretoria (1992) - Cragge
 Bopha! (1993) - Retleif
 Orkney Snork Nie! 2 (nog 'n movie) (1993) - Arri
 Project Shadowchaser 2 (1993) - Prine
 Cyborg Cop II (1994) - Fats
 Guns of Honour (1994, TV Movie) - Le Blanc
 Never say Die (1994) - Angel
 Lipstiek Dipstiek (1994) - Frikkie, security guard
 the Redemption (1994)
 Lunar Cop (1995) - Stopper
 Hearts & Minds (1995) - Willem
 Dangerous Ground (1997) - Iron Guard
 Fools (1997) - Whiteman
 Black Velvet Band (1997, TV Movie) - Vermeer
 Tarzan and the Lost City (1998) - High Priest (uncredited)
 An Old Womans Tale (1998, TV Movie) - Neels
 Running Free (1998) - Blacksmith
 Africa (1999) - Garage Owner
 The Meeksville Ghost (2001) - Ox
 Glory, Glory (aka: Hooded Angels) (2002) - Silus
 Stander (2003) - Loud Speaker Cop
 Proteus (2003) - Munster
 Berserker - Hell's Warrior (2004) - Bystander
 Red Dust (2004) - Duty Officer
 Man to Man (2005) - Douglas
 Coup (2006, TV Movie) - Horn
 The Fall (2006) - Luigi / One Legged Actor
 Running Riot (2006) - Vladimir Brutonov
 Forestry in Africa (2006)
 Poena Is Koning (2007) - Security guard
 The Scorpion King 2 (2008) - High Priest
 The Seven of Daran (2008) - Van Pelt
 Deadly Harvest (2008, TV Movie) - Sailor
 Invictus (2009) - Johan De Villiers
 Master Harold...and the Boys (2010) - Man in Bar / Radio news reader
 Beauty (2011) - Gideon
 Il console italiano (2011) - Police Captain
 Angus Buchan's Ordinary People (2012) - Herman Visser
 Leonardo (2012, TV Series)
 Bordering on Bad Behavior (2014) - Australian Minister
 Strikdas (2015) - Adriaan Blignaut
 Snaaks Genoeg (2016) - Dawid van der Merwe
 The Kissing Booth (2018) - Pavilion Security
 Fried Barry (2020) - Alien preacher

References

External links
 
 
 

South African male professional wrestlers
South African male actors
Living people
Professional wrestling managers and valets
1955 births
Male actors from Cape Town
Sportspeople from Cape Town